"Turbo Polka" is Atomik Harmonik's first world hit. The song is a cover version of their first hit Brizgalna Brizga. The remix for the song was contributed by Eiffel 65. It was a #34 hit in Germany and #64 in Austria.

Track listing 
Turbo Polka (radio mix) (3:26)
Turbo Polka (radio extended) (5:22)
Turbo Polka (apres ski mix) (3:41)
Turbo Polka (dance mix) (3:58)
Turbo Polka (polka mix) (3:28)
Turbo Polka (karaoke mix) (3:26)
Brizgalna Brizga (original) (3:56)
Turbo Polka (joghurt splash mix) (2:55)

2005 singles
Atomik Harmonik songs